Jung Hae-kyun (born August 16, 1968) is a South Korean actor. He is known for his roles in The Villainess, Along With the Gods: The Two Worlds and Confession of Murder. He has appeared in many films and television series in a supporting role.

Filmography

Films

Television series

Web shows

References

External links 
 Jung Hae-kyun at HanCinema

1968 births
Living people
21st-century South Korean male actors
South Korean male television actors
South Korean male film actors